The 1925 West Tennessee State Teachers football team was an American football team that represented West Tennessee State Teachers College (now known as the University of Memphis) as an independent during the 1925 college football season. In their second season under head coach Zach Curlin, West Tennessee State Teachers compiled a 0–7–1 record.

Schedule

References

West Tennessee Teachers
Memphis Tigers football seasons
College football winless seasons
West Tennessee Teachers football